Ann-Christine Albertsson is a Swedish chemist, currently Professor at Royal Institute of Technology and the Editor-in-Chief of American Chemical Society's Biomacromolecules. Her research interest are biomacromolecules and polymers.

Education
She earned her Doctorate from Royal Institute of Technology in 1977.

Career
She started as a lecturer at Royal Institute of Technology in 1980 before serving as acting professor in 1986 until being official appointed as professor in 1989. She has also been visiting scholar at Polytechnic University of New York, University of Kyoto, University of Massachusetts at Amherst and Research Institute for Polymers and Textiles.

Selected publications
 Recent developments in ring opening polymerization of lactones for biomedical applications, AC Albertsson, IK Varma - Biomacromolecules, 2003, ACS Publications
 The mechanism of biodegradation of polyethylene, Polymer Degradation and Stability, Volume 18, Issue 1, 1987, Pages 73–87.

Recent publications

References

Academic staff of the KTH Royal Institute of Technology
KTH Royal Institute of Technology alumni
20th-century Swedish chemists
21st-century Swedish chemists
Living people
Place of birth missing (living people)
Swedish women chemists
Academic journal editors
1945 births